Colonel the Hon. Sir George Sidney Herbert, 1st Baronet (8 October 1886 – 30 January 1942) was an English businessman and member of the Royal Household.

Early life and education 
George Sidney Herbert was born on 8 October 1886 to Sidney Herbert, the 14th Earl of Pembroke, and Lady Beatrix Louisa Lambton. He was the fourth of four children, and the second of two sons; his brother Reginald would take their father's titles. George Herbert was educated at Eton, where he was in Henry Bowlby's house, and then Magdalen College at the University of Oxford.

In 1902 Herbert served as his father's page at the Coronation of Edward VII and Alexandra, walking behind his father and carrying his coronet during the king and queen's procession.

Career 
Herbert was a member of the 2nd (Eton College) Buckinghamshire Rifle Volunteer Corps as early as 1905, androm 1914 to 1919, served as a colonel in the First World War. Later, he was the director of the Wilton Royal Carpet Factory, of Wessex Associated News Ltd, and of Western Gazette Co. Ltd. He was also a local director for Liverpool, London & Globe Insurance Co. Ltd.

Herbert became part of the Royal Household in 1928, with his appointment as a Gentleman Usher to King George V; he took the place of Sir Lionel Cust, who had resigned. His appointment continued during the reigns of Edward VIII and George VI in turn; in 1936 was named an aide-de-camp to the king, and the following year a groom in waiting. As part of the 1937 New Year Honours 1937 he was created a baronet, "for political and public services in Wiltshire".

Personal life 
Herbert lived in East Knoyle, at Knoyle House. He enjoyed gardening, shooting for recreation, and was a member of the Carlton Club. He was the cousin of Sir Sidney Herbert, and served along with Vivian Smith as executor for his estate upon his 1939 death. George Herbert was himself bequeathed £40,000, along with a life interest in the Boyton Manor estate and £50,000 for its upkeep; his responsibilities as executor also included attending to a locked tin deed box, which the will requested be "destroyed unopened by cremating". Herbert was also a trustee for a young Charles Chetwynd-Talbot, the 20th Earl of Shrewsbury, upon the death of his father.

Herbert died suddenly on 30 January 1942 aged 55; he had a heart attack while en route to Bath, Somerset and died at a nursing home in the city that his chauffeur drove him to. He left an unsettled estate of £71,085 15s 2d, with net personalty £70,045 7s 10d. After £22,075 in taxes he bequeathed £500 to Salisbury Division Conservative Association, and £250 each to a butler, gardener, chauffeur, and keeper; the remaining £41,000 he left to his mother for life, and then to the family member living at Boyton. A bachelor, he left no heir to his baronetcy, which became extinct.

References 

1886 births
1942 deaths
Alumni of Magdalen College, Oxford
Baronets in the Baronetage of the United Kingdom
George Sidney
Gentlemen Ushers
People educated at Eton College
Younger sons of earls